Community Development Alliance Scotland (CDAS) is a network of organisations that are concerned with community development in Scotland.
CDAS is a member of the Scottish Government's Better Community Engagement national advisory group and submits formal responses to relevant Scottish Government policy consultations, such as the 2008 Local Healthcare Bill and the 2011 'Building a Sustainable Future' regeneration discussion paper.

Members

CDAS has over 50 members, including:

 Association of Directors of Social Work
 Association of Scottish Community Councils
 Black and Ethnic Minority Infrastructure Scotland
 Care Commission
 Chartered Institute of Housing in Scotland
 Community Health Exchange
 Community Learning & Development Managers Scotland
 Consumer Focus Scotland
 Convention of Scottish Local Authorities
 Deafblind Scotland
 Development Trusts Association Scotland
 Electoral Reform Society (Scotland)
 Equality and Human Rights Commission
 Equality Network
 Federation for Community Development Learning
 Future Balance
 Generations Working Together
 Greenspace Scotland
 Health Scotland (observer status)
 Her Majesty's Inspectorate of Education (observer status)
 Highlands & Islands Enterprise
 International Association for Community Development
 International Futures Forum
 Learning and Teaching Scotland
 Linked Work and Training Trust
 Long Term Conditions Alliance Scotland
 Momentum
 Oxfam
 Planning Aid for Scotland
 Poverty Alliance
 Regional Screen Scotland
 Scotland's Colleges
 Scottish Churches Housing Action
 Scottish Community Development Centre
 Scottish Community Development Network
 Scottish Community Safety Network
 Scottish Coproducttion Practitioners Network
 Scottish Council for Voluntary Organisations
 Scottish Development Centre for Mental Health
 Scottish Federation of Housing Associations
 Scottish Government (observer status)
 Scottish Grant Making Trusts Group
 Scottish Human Rights Commission
 Scottish Urban Regeneration Forum
 Tenant Participation Advisory Service Scotland
 Volunteer Development Scotland
 Wise Group
 Working on Wheels
 Youth Link Scotland
 Youth Scotland

External links
 Official website

References 

Organisations based in Glasgow
2007 establishments in Scotland
Organizations established in 2007
Community development organizations
Scottish society
Charities based in Scotland
Welfare in Scotland
Organisations supported by the Scottish Government